Island Challenge Cup is a rowing event for women's student eights at the annual Henley Royal Regatta on the River Thames at Henley-on-Thames in England.

The event is open to members of a boat club of any university, college or secondary school. Combined entries may only be made by no more than two college boat clubs of any one university. It was inaugurated in 2020 but due to the COVID-19 pandemic was unable to hold its inaugural running.

Winners

References

Events at Henley Royal Regatta
Rowing trophies and awards